Germany competed at the 2018 Athletics World Cup in London, United Kingdom, between 14 and 15 July 2018. A delegation of 44 athletes were sent to represent the country.

Results

Men

Women

References

External links
Home page

Nations at the 2018 Athletics World Cup